Mohamed Warsama Ragueh is a Djiboutian lawyer and former judge. He was the president of the Constitutional Council and a candidate in the 2011 presidential election. He could only secure 19% of the vote losing to Ismail Omar Guelleh who won 80% of the votes. Djibouti's opposition coalitions boycotted the election, saying it would not be free and fair, leaving only President Guelleh and Ragueh, who had served as President of Djibouti's Constitutional Council in 2005. Ragueh complained about irregularities in the voting.

Links

External links
 Ahram Online

Living people
Djiboutian lawyers
Djiboutian judges
Djiboutian politicians
Year of birth missing (living people)